Adam Redmond (born May 19, 1993) is an American football center who is a free agent. He was signed by the Indianapolis Colts as an undrafted free agent after the 2016 NFL Draft. He played college football at Harvard.

Early years
Redmond attended Walsh Jesuit High School, where he received Division Two All-district honors in his last 2 years as a starter at offensive tackle and long snapper. He accepted a football scholarship from Harvard University. As a sophomore in 2013, he started 9 games at left tackle.

As a junior in 2014, he started all 10 games at left tackle and received honorable-mention All-Ivy League honors. As a senior in 2015, he started all 10 games at center and was named first-team  All-Ivy League. He played a total of 31 career games and studied sociology.

Professional career

Indianapolis Colts
Redmond was signed as an undrafted free agent by the Indianapolis Colts after the 2016 NFL Draft on May 2. He was released by the Colts on September 3, 2016, and was signed to the practice squad the next day. He spent time on and off the Colts' practice squad during the season before signing a reserve/future contract with the team on January 2, 2017.

On September 2, 2017, Redmond was waived by the Colts and was signed to the practice squad the next day. He was promoted to the active roster on September 9. He appeared in the first 4 games, before being waived on October 6.

Buffalo Bills
On October 10, 2017, Redmond was signed to the Buffalo Bills' practice squad. He signed a reserve/future contract with the Bills on January 8, 2018. On September 1, 2018, Redmond was waived by the Bills.

Dallas Cowboys
On September 2, 2018, Redmond was claimed off waivers by the Dallas Cowboys. He appeared in 10 games as a backup offensive lineman. In 2019, he was declared inactive in the first 9 games, before being placed on the injured reserve list on November 16.

On March 9, 2020, Redmond signed a one-year-deal with the Cowboys. He was released on September 2, 2020. He was re-signed to the practice squad on October 12, 2020. He was elevated to the active roster on October 24 and November 21 for the team's weeks 7 and 11 games against the Washington Football Team and Minnesota Vikings, and reverted to the practice squad after each game. He was promoted to the active roster on November 25, 2020. He was waived on December 12, 2020, and re-signed to the practice squad four days later. He signed a reserve/future contract with the Cowboys on January 4, 2021. He was released on May 5, 2021.

Chicago Bears
On May 19, 2021, Redmond signed with the Chicago Bears. He was released on August 31, 2021.

Baltimore Ravens
On October 20, 2021, Redmond was signed to the Baltimore Ravens practice squad. His contract expired on January 10, 2022.

References

External links
Harvard Crimson bio

1993 births
Living people
People from Cuyahoga Falls, Ohio
People from Strongsville, Ohio
Players of American football from Ohio
Sportspeople from Cuyahoga County, Ohio
American football offensive guards
Harvard Crimson football players
Indianapolis Colts players
Buffalo Bills players
Dallas Cowboys players
Chicago Bears players